The Bensen Mid-Jet (a pun on "Midget jet") was a small helicopter developed by Igor Bensen in the United States in the early 1950s in the hope of attracting the interest of the United States Navy. It was a single-seat, open framework machine based on the B-5 rotor kite with small, gasoline- or fuel oil-burning ramjets mounted as tipjets on the rotor blades. Tests carried out in 1954 showed it to be able to lift four times its own weight and cruise at 75 mph (120 km/h).

Specifications

See also

References

External links
 Bensen Aircraft Foundation
 Bensen Aircraft at Vortechonline.com

1950s United States experimental aircraft
1950s United States helicopters
Mid-Jet
Ramjet-powered aircraft
Tipjet-powered helicopters
Aircraft first flown in 1953